Augustine Boakye (born 3 November 2000) is a Ghanaian professional footballer who plays as a midfielder for Austrian Football Bundesliga club Wolfsberger AC.

Career
Boakye began his football career with WAFA in the Ghana Premier League.

In August 2021, Boakye signed a four-year contract with Austrian Football Bundesliga club Wolfsberger AC.

Career statistics

Club

Notes

References

2000 births
Living people
Ghanaian footballers
Ghanaian expatriate footballers
Association football midfielders
Ghana Premier League players
Austrian Football Bundesliga players
West African Football Academy players
Wolfsberger AC players
Expatriate footballers in Austria
Ghanaian expatriate sportspeople in Austria
People from Ashanti Region